Cameron Whitmore (born July 8, 2004) is an American college basketball player for the Villanova Wildcats of the Big East Conference. He was a consensus five-star recruit and one of the top players in the 2022 class.

High school career
Whitmore attended Archbishop Spalding High School in Severn, Maryland. As a senior, he was the Capital Gazette boys basketball player of the year. He was selected to play in the 2022 McDonald's All-American Boys Game. He played in the 2022 FIBA Under-18 Americas Championship, where he was named MVP.

Recruiting
Whitmore was a consensus five-star recruit and one of the top players in the 2022 class, according to major recruiting services. On October 7, 2021, he committed to playing college basketball for Villanova over offers from Illinois and North Carolina.

College career
After missing seven games with a thumb injury, Whitmore made his collegiate debut versus Oklahoma. In his first season with Villanova, Whitmore averaged 12.5 points 5.3 rebounds and 0.7 assists per game. At the conclusion of his freshman year, Whitmore was named the Big East Conference Men's Basketball Freshman of the Year.

References

External links
Villanova Wildcats bio
USA Basketball bio

2004 births
Living people
American men's basketball players
Basketball players from Maryland
McDonald's High School All-Americans
People from Odenton, Maryland
Small forwards
Villanova Wildcats men's basketball players